The International Tour of Rhodes is an annual professional cycling stage race held in Rhodes, Greece. It was first held in 1987, but the second edition only took place in 1995. Between 2001 and 2003 it became a professional race. Fabian Cancellara won the race twice, in 2001 and 2002, including his first victory as a professional in 2001. The race was not held from 2004 until 2017 when it returned to the calendar as a 2.2 event and part of the UCI Europe Tour.

Winners

See also

Tour of Greece, 
Rhodes Grand Prix,

References

External links
 

Cycle races in Greece
Recurring sporting events established in 1987
Men's road bicycle races
1987 establishments in Greece